Verteillac is a commune in the Dordogne department in Nouvelle-Aquitaine in south-western France. In 2014, the feast of Félibrée was held in Verteillac.

International relation
It is twinned with Fontanetto Po in Italy.

Population

Sights

 Château du Breuil, 16th-17th century
 Château de la Grénerie, 19th century
 , 18th-19th century
 Verteillac church

Shopping
Verteillac is a local shopping centre for the nearby villages. It has a general store (Merlaud, which sells everything from lettuce to lawn mowers), butchers, bakers, a brocante, a choice of cafes and restaurants.

Personalities
 Martine Aurillac, députée for Paris, was member of the municipal council of Verteillac from 1971 until 1977.

See also
Communes of the Dordogne department
 Périgord

References

External links

 Official site

Communes of Dordogne